Barchaniella is a genus of moths in the family Cossidae.

Species
Barchaniella inspersus (Christoph, 1887)
Barchaniella mus (Grum-Grshimailo, 1902)
Barchaniella sacara (Grum-Grshimailo, 1902)

Etymology
The genus name is derived from Turkik barkhan (meaning a motile sand hill with a crescent shape).

References

Natural History Museum Lepidoptera generic names catalog

Cossinae
Moth genera